Peter Armbruster (born 25 July 1931) is a German physicist at the Gesellschaft für Schwerionenforschung (GSI) facility in Darmstadt, Germany, and is credited with co-discovering elements 107 (bohrium), 108 (hassium), 109 (meitnerium), 110 (darmstadtium), 111 (roentgenium), and 112 (copernicium) with research partner Gottfried Münzenberg.

Armbruster was born in Dachau, Bavaria. He studied physics at the Technical University of Stuttgart and Munich, and obtained his Ph.D. in 1961 under Heinz Maier-Leibnitz, Technical University of Munich. His major research fields are fission, interaction of heavy ions in matter and atomic physics with fission product beams at the Research Centre of Jülich (1965 to 1970). He was Senior Scientist at the Gesellschaft für Schwerionenforschung Darmstadt, GSI, from 1971 to 1996. From 1989 to 1992 he was research Director of the European Institut Laue-Langevin (ILL), Grenoble. Since 1996 he has been involved in a project on incineration of nuclear waste by spallation and fission reactions.

He was affiliated as professor to the University of Cologne (1968) and the Darmstadt University of Technology since 1984. 

He has received many awards for his work, including the Max Born Medal and Prize awarded by the Institute of Physics and the Deutsche Physikalische Gesellschaft in 1988, and the Stern-Gerlach Medal awarded by the Deutsche Physikalische Gesellschaft in 1997. The American Chemical Society honoured Peter Armbruster 1997 as one of few non-Americans with the 'Nuclear Chemistry Award'.

References 
 Peter Armbruster: Bau eines Massenseparators für Spaltprodukte und Nachweis einer Anregung innerer Elektronenschalen bei der Abbremsung von Spaltprodukten T.H. München, F. f. allg. Wiss., PhD thesis, 21. Jan. 1961

Sources 
Jefferson Lab

1931 births
Discoverers of chemical elements
20th-century German physicists
Technical University of Munich alumni
Living people
People from Dachau

Academic staff of Technische Universität Darmstadt